The 2013 Shannons Nationals Motor Racing Championships season was the eighth time that the Shannons Nationals Motor Racing Championships were held. The season began on 22 March 2013 at Sydney Motorsport Park and finished on 17 November 2013 at Sandown Raceway.

The 2013 Australian Manufacturers' Championship, 2013 Australian Saloon Car Series, 2013 Australian Superkart Championship, 2013 Australian Suzuki Swift Series, 2013 Kerrick Sports Sedan Series and the 2013 Kumho V8 Touring Car Series were all held exclusively on the Shannons Nationals calendar. Rounds of the 2013 Australian Drivers' Championship, 2013 Australian GT Championship, 2013 Porsche GT3 Cup Challenge Australia, 2013 PRB Motorsport Series and the 2013 Radical Australia Cup were also part of the Shannons Nationals schedule.

Calendar and round winners

Series champions

References

2013 in Australian motorsport